The SkyRace Internazionale Valmalenco Valposchiavo was an international skyrunning competition held for the first time in 2002 and for the last time in 2013. It is held every year in June from Lanzada (Valmalenco, Italy) to Poschiavo (Switzerland) and was valid for the Skyrunner World Series.

Editions
Five times the race was valid as SkyRace for the Skyrunner World Series, one of these was part of the Skyrunner World Series Trails.

See also 
 Skyrunner World Series

References

External links 
 Official web site

Skyrunning competitions
Skyrunner World Series